Bobet may refer to:

in people:
Jean Bobet (born 1930), French cyclist
Louison Bobet (1925-1983), French cyclist

in other:
A flag which monitors which way the wind is blowing, like a weather vane
Louison Bobet (bicycles), line of bicycles produced by Louison Bobet